Benchmark Email is an international, internet-based service provider of email marketing with headquarters in St. Louis, MO. The company was founded by Curt and Denise Keller in 2004.

The company offers various free and paid editions. Benchmark is a member of Returnpath.net and the Email Sender & Provider Coalition industry consortiums.

Expansion into international markets has been pursued by the company, translating the software from English into Spanish, French, German, Chinese, Japanese, Portuguese, and Italian and establishing offices in the Philippines, Japan, China, India, Spain, Taiwan and Italy among several other countries. Recently, the website was also launched in French.

In 2017, Benchmark Email was named one of the "20 B2B Technologies To Try in 2017" by Forbes.

In 2019, Benchmark Email merged with Hatchbuck, and day-to-day leadership was transferred to Jonathan Herrick, the former CEO of Hatchbuck. The flagship Hatchbuck product was rebranded as BenchmarkONE.

See also
 Email Marketing
 Social Media Marketing

References

External links
 Official Company Website

Email marketing software
Companies based in California
Digital marketing companies of the United States
Cloud applications